The 2014 college football season may refer to:

American leagues
2014 NCAA Division I FBS football season
2014 NCAA Division I FCS football season
2014 NCAA Division II football season
2014 NCAA Division III football season
2014 NAIA football season

Non-American leagues
2014 Japan college football season
2014 CIS football season